Homological dimension may refer to the global dimension of a ring. It may also refer to any other concept of dimension that is defined in terms of homological algebra, which includes:
 Projective dimension of a module, based on projective resolutions
 Injective dimension of a module, based on injective resolutions
 Weak dimension of a module, or flat dimension, based on flat resolutions
 Weak global dimension of a ring, based on the weak dimension of its modules 
 Cohomological dimension of a group

Homological algebra